The  was a 19-ton tourist boat operating off the Hokkaido island of Japan, travelling around the Shiretoko Peninsula. The Shiretoko Peninsula, designated a natural World Heritage Site in 2005, is a popular destination for observing drift ice and rare animals.

The boat sank on 23 April 2022 with twenty six people on board. Fourteen bodies have been recovered with twelve missing. No survivors were found.

Background 
Kazu I was initially built as Hikari 8 in February of 1985 at a shipyard in Yamaguchi for use of a ferry service between Mihara and Ikuchi-jima by the Hourai Kisen. Those who knew the ship back then, upon hearing the demise of Kazu I, remarked that the ship was built specifically for the calm seas of the Inland Sea in mind and was not for the rough open seas, such as those at the Okhotsk Sea. Hikari 8 was sold after a few years, and again in the 1990s to a ferry operator Okayama Prefecture to serve the route between Hinase and Ushimado, only for the company to go bankrupt a few years later as well. The ship's ownership was transferred to an individual in Osaka before ultimately being sold to Shiretoko Pleasure Cruise in Fall of 2005.

Kazu I's twin engine was reduced to just a single engine soon after the ship was transferred to Shiretoko, with the removed engine reused for a different cruiser Shiretoko Pleasure Cruise operated. In 2015, a Bulbous Bow was added to the ship, and the ship's length was stretched from 11.86 meters to 12.14 meters, as well as the depth changing from 1.52 to 1.62 meters. In 2021 the remaining engine was replaced as the engine was old.

Incidents
In June 2021 she ran aground in shallow water shortly after leaving port; no one was injured.

Sinking 
On 13:15 local time Saturday 23 April 2022 the ship went missing with 26 people on board, of which two were crew and two were children. The ship was crewed by a 54 year old captain and a 27 year old deckhand. The crew signaled that the boat was listing at 30 degrees and was about to sink. The crew said all aboard were wearing life jackets, however the water temperature reaches 0 degrees Celsius at night. Due to high waves in the area, local fishing boats had decided to return to port. The Japan Coast Guard dispatched five patrol boats and two aircraft to search for survivors.

As of 30 April 2022 fourteen people have been confirmed dead, and the rest are missing. On 29 April the wreckage of the boat was found, located on a slope near the Shiretoko Peninsula at a depth of 115–120 meters. On 8 May, a submersible was used to probe the sunken boat in an attempt to locate the bodies of the twelve remaining missing people.

The Kazu I had been advised by another tourism operator not to leave port due to the hazardous sea conditions. It was the first tourist boat to be operated in the Shiretoko area, 3 other local tourism ship operators delaying the start of their seasons due to weather. Forecasts at the time of the accident showed high winds and waves reaching as high as 3 meters. The ship also operated alone, breaking a safety agreement with other operators that at least 2 ships should be together at sea. In a press conference on 28 April Shiretoko Pleasure cruise CEO Seiichi Katsurada bowed on the floor and apologized, stating "We caused a disastrous accident, and I’m very sorry." He admitted that the main antenna and satellite phone on deck were known to be inoperable prior to the disaster. Katsurada stated he had approved the trip as he considered that the captain could utilize a cellphone and other boat operators could assist as well. His actions attracted condemnation from both former Shiretoko Pleasure cruise employees and the Ministry of Land, Infrastructure, Transport and Tourism, Tetsuo Saito calling his conduct "unthinkable."

On 2 May 2022, the Japanese coast guard raided the offices of the tour boat operator as part of a criminal investigation into the sinking. On 11 May 2022 the Hokkaido Joint Communications Bureau announced it was investigating the operators of the Kazu I over their use of amateur HAM transmissions for communicating with ships at sea. Enterprise use of amateur radio frequencies is illegal in Japan. The practice reportedly started as a cost-cutting measure as expensive satellite calls were billed to individual crew members.

In late June Russia found two bodies on Kunashir Island, and then another additional body on the south coast of Sakhalin, of likely victims from Kazu I.

References

Shipwrecks in the Pacific Ocean
Maritime incidents in Japan
Maritime incidents in 2022
April 2022 events in Japan
Ships lost with all hands